2016–17 Inter State Twenty-20 Tournament was a Twenty20 cricket tournament in India. This was the first edition of the tournament, with the top teams qualifying for the 2016–17 Syed Mushtaq Ali Trophy. The tournament was held from 29 January 2017 to 6 February 2017. 28 full members of BCCI participated in the tournament. Teams were divided in 5 geographical zones and competed within the zones in a Round-robin tournament. One winner was be declared from each zone. The tournament was established to set a stage for players to audition for the upcoming 2016–17 Syed Mushtaq Ali Trophy and 2017 Indian Premier League.

Central Zone

Squads

Squads -

Points Table

Fixtures

East Zone

Squads

Points Table

Fixtures

North Zone

Squads

Points Table

Fixtures

South Zone

Squads

Points Table

Fixtures

West Zone

Squads

Points Table

Fixtures

References

External links
 Series home at ESPN Cricinfo

Domestic cricket competitions in 2016–17
2017 in Indian cricket